CPTP may refer to:
 Civilian Pilot Training Program
 Chronic Postvasectomy Testicular Pain
 Completely-positive trace preserving map in quantum physics